Jouret El Ballout is a village in the Matn District in the Mount Lebanon Governorate of Lebanon.

Etymology
The village of Jouret El Ballout owes its name to its geographical position – a low point surrounded by mountains (Mar Chaaya mountain to the north and Haref mountain to the west):  means pit or cavern in Arabic. It is also surrounded by tall pine and oak trees bearing acorns. Therefore, the name is a description of the village: The Pit of Acorns.

Location
It is bordered by Nabay from the west, Deir Mar Cha’aya from the north, Broummana from the east and Kannaba Broummana from the south. It can be reached via three different routes: 
Mkalles - Beit Merry - Broumanna - Jouret El-Ballout, Antelias - Deir As-Salib - Nabay - Jouret El-Ballout, or Maten highway.

Climate
Summer is usually dry in jouret el ballout; it begins in early May and ends in mid-October. Its relative humidity in summer runs at 68%.

Archeological and cultural sites
Despite the relatively recent inception of the village, remains of several stone and earthen sarcophagi have been found there. The region of A’aranta in Jouret El-Ballout is in fact well known for its archeological wealth: remains of an old fortress were discovered, as well as some Phoenicians and Romanian tombs. Excavation works also showed that wood blast furnaces going back to the Phoenician era existed on this site.

Educational institutions
A public school was founded in the village in 1946, but it closed in 1980's. Today, there are two private schools in Jouret El-Ballout:
Collège Louise Wegmann
Valley International School

References

Populated places in the Matn District